The Antigua Hawksbills was a Caribbean Premier League (CPL) franchise based in Antigua and Barbuda, that played its home games at the Sir Vivian Richards Stadium in Saint Peter Parish, Antigua. The name 'Hawksbills' comes after the sea turtle that populates around the Caribbean Sea and is critically endangered according to the World Conservation Union. 

The franchise was one of six 
teams that was established for the inaugural CPL season in 2013, and the only one located in the Leeward Islands. The Hawksbills placed fifth in 2013, and then last during the 2014 edition of the CPL, winning three of out its sixteen games during that time. Antiguan Viv Richards coached the team in 2013, but was replaced by Tim Nielsen, an Australian, for the 2014 season. Marlon Samuels, a Jamaican, was the team's captain for both seasons.

In February 2015, it was announced that the Antigua Hawksbills would not participate in the 2015 CPL season, with a number of its players to instead play with a new franchise based in Saint Kitts and Nevis. It is intended that the Hawksbills franchise will be revived at a later date, with the CPL consequently featuring seven teams rather than six.

Statistics

Most runs 

Source: ESPNcricinfo, Last updated: 10 September 2020

Most wickets 

Source: ESPNcricinfo, Last updated: 10 September 2020

Overall results 

Last updated: 12 February 2021

 Abandoned matches are counted as NR (no result)
 Win or loss by super over or boundary count are counted as tied.
 Tied+Win – Counted as a win and Tied+Loss – Counted as a loss
NR indicates no result

Source: ESPNcricinfo

Stadium
The Sir Vivian Richards Stadium was the home ground of the Hawksbills during both campaigns of the 2013 and 2014 seasons respectively. The stadium hosts a capacity of 10,000 and is around a 10 minute drive from the capital city. The stadium was built after the 2007 Cricket World Cup that was staged in the West Indies with the ends named after two national icons in Curtly Ambrose and Andy Roberts. The team only won 2 out of the 6 games that were played in the stadium during their short history with both of the victories coming in the inaugural season of the Caribbean Premier League.

Kits
The Hawksbills played in a predominantly black uniform that featured the yellow rising sun and also shades of light blue, white and red. The kit was replicated from the Antiguan Flag with Caribbean Alliance Insurance the main sponsor of the team. The kit manufacturer of the team was BAS (Beat All Sports) which sponsored all kits of the franchises.

Seasons

Caribbean Premier League

References

External links
 Antigua on CPLT20.com
 
 

Cricket in Antigua and Barbuda
Cricket teams in the West Indies
Caribbean Premier League teams
Cricket clubs established in 2013
2013 establishments in Antigua and Barbuda
2015 disestablishments in Antigua and Barbuda
Sports clubs disestablished in 2015